Atya is a genus of freshwater shrimp of the family Atyidae, ranging through the Antilles and along the Atlantic and Pacific slopes of Central and South America and in western Africa. It contains the following species:
Atya abelei Felgenhauer & Martin, 1983
Atya africana Bouvier, 1904
Atya brachyrhinus Hobbs & Hart, 1982
Atya crassa (Smith, 1871)
Atya dressleri Abele, 1975
Atya gabonensis Giebel, 1875
Atya innocous (Herbst, 1792)
Atya intermedia Bouvier, 1904
Atya lanipes Holthuis, 1963
Atya limnetes Holthuis, 1986
Atya margaritacea A. Milne-Edwards, 1874
Atya ortmannioides Villalobos, 1956
Atya scabra (Leach, 1815)

References

Atyidae
Freshwater crustaceans